South Lynn railway station was a railway station serving the areas of South Lynn and West Lynn in King's Lynn in Norfolk, England. The station was on the Midland and Great Northern Joint Railway.

History

The Lynn & Sutton Bridge Railway was authorised on 6 August 1861, to build a line between those points. The first station after King's Lynn was West Lynn, which was located at the western end of the bridge over the Great Ouse; that station was closed on 1 July 1886. The station at South Lynn was opened on 1 January 1886 along with other improvements in the area.

South Lynn station was closed to passengers on 2 March 1959. It was located at the southern end of King's Lynn, and saw far less traffic than King's Lynn railway station.

Routes

See also
 King's Lynn railway station
 List of closed railway stations in Norfolk
 Railways in Norfolk

References

External links

The railway bridges of South Lynn, among other remnants, exploring some of the still-extant structures around the former site of South Lynn railway station.

Disused railway stations in Norfolk
Former Midland and Great Northern Joint Railway stations
Railway stations in Great Britain opened in 1886
Railway stations in Great Britain closed in 1959
King's Lynn
1886 establishments in England